Faisal Iqbal (born 16 August 1992) is a Pakistani footballer, who plays as both left-back and left-winger for National Bank.

He earned his first international cap against Turkmenistan in the qualifiers for the 2012 AFC Challenge Cup.

References

Pakistani footballers
Pakistan international footballers
1992 births
Living people
Association football wingers
NBP F.C. players